Ruan Xian (fl. 3rd century), courtesy name Zhongrong, was a Chinese scholar who lived in the Six Dynasties period. One of the Seven Sages of the Bamboo Grove, he was a skilled player of the Chinese lute, an old version of pipa which has been called ruan after his name since the Tang dynasty. His achievement in music reached such high as to be described as "divine understanding" in the Book of Jin. Ruan Xian had a Xianbei slave who gave birth to his son, Ruan Fu.

References

Seven Sages of the Bamboo Grove
Year of death unknown
Pipa players
Cao Wei musicians
Jin dynasty (266–420) musicians
Jin dynasty (266–420) politicians
Political office-holders in Shaanxi
Musicians from Henan
Politicians from Kaifeng
Year of birth unknown
3rd-century Chinese musicians